Andrew Scott Baldwin (born October 20, 1982) is a former professional baseball pitcher. He was originally drafted by the Philadelphia Phillies in the fifth Round of the 2004 Major League Baseball Draft. Baldwin's uncle, John Hiller, was a relief pitcher for the Detroit Tigers.

Amateur career

High school
Baldwin graduated from Hood River Valley High School in 2000.

College
Baldwin attended Texas A&M University and later transferred to Oregon State University. At OSU he had an 8–6 record. He was drafted in 2004 by the Philadelphia Phillies.

Professional career

Philadelphia Phillies
He began his career with the Class-A Short Season Batavia Muckdogs. There he compiled a 4–6 record with a 5.17 ERA in 15 starts. At the end of the season he went on to pitch in Florida Instructional League.

In 2005 Baldwin spent entire season with Class A Lakewood BlueClaws, where he led the South Atlantic League in innings pitched. He was named the Phillies Minor League Pitcher of the Week twice. He finished the season with a 5-12 record with a 4.77 ERA in 27 starts.

Baldwin began the season with the Class A Clearwater Threshers where he made seven starts out of the bullpen before moving to the starting rotation on April 27.

Seattle Mariners
On August 20,  he was traded to the Seattle Mariners with teammate Andrew Barb for the left-hander Jamie Moyer. He was then assigned to the Class-A Inland Empire 66ers. His combined record was 10–9 with a 3.69 ERA.

He spent the entire season with the Double-A West Tenn Diamond Jaxx where he led the Southern League with 166.0 innings pitched. He was 5-12 with a 4.23 ERA. Baldwin finished third among all Mariners farmhands with 115 strikeouts and 8th in ERA.

Dubbed "King of the Hill" by his teammates, Baldwin spent the entire  season with the Triple-A Tacoma Rainiers. He led all Mariners minor leaguers with 10 wins, while also setting a career-high. He finished with a record of 10–5 with a 4.75 ERA.

In  Baldwin spent the entire season with the Triple-A Tacoma Rainiers of the Pacific Coast League. He went 6-11 with 103 strikeouts and a 4.51 ERA in 31 games, 21 starts. On August 10 he was named the Pacific Coast League Pitcher of the Week after he threw a complete game shutout against the Round Rock on August 5.

He signed minor league contract with Minnesota Twins for 2011 season on 12/15/2010.

In 2012, he played in Mexico, with Rieleros de Aguascalientes and Saraperos de Saltillo.

He started the 2013 season with Rimini Baseball, in Italy, but he was waived after 4 played games.

References

External links
Career statistics and player information from Minor League Baseball and Baseball-Reference (Minors)

1982 births
Living people
Oregon State Beavers baseball players
Batavia Muckdogs players
Lakewood BlueClaws players
Clearwater Threshers players
Inland Empire 66ers of San Bernardino players
West Tennessee Diamond Jaxx players
Tacoma Rainiers players
Rochester Red Wings players